The Amplepuis–Saint-Vincent-de-Reins railway was a  standard gauge railway in the Seine-et-Marne department in the Île-de-France region of France, which was operated by the  Compagnie du chemin de fer d’intérêt local d’Amplepuis à Saint-Vincent-de-Reins (ASV) from 1907 to 1928.

History 
From 1929, the line was operated by the Chemin de fer du Rhône (CFR) until it was closed in 1935. After the closure, the line was dismantled, and the locomotives, wagons and rails were sold to be exported for the construction of the railway network in Ethiopia.

The line was used for the transport of passengers and goods. The freight traffic consisted mainly of wood and coal, which were needed in the weaving mills and spinning mills, among others, which were increasingly powered by steam engines:

Usines Gouttenoire et Cie (now Deveaux SA), Mechanical Cotton Weaving Mill, in the hamlet of Gouttenoire near Saint-Vincent-de-Reins
Usine Rollin, mechanical weaving mill, St-Vincent-de-Reins
Usine Suchel, in the hamlet of La Tuliere
Usine Deveaux (Filature Hydraulique de P. Lacroix, L. Lacroix & Berger Successeurs), Saint-Vincent-de-Reins
Usine textile au Lacheron

Route 
An extension through a tunnel to Belleroche had already been planned and marked out in 1914. However, World War I prevented the construction work necessary for the line extension.

Stations and locomotives

References 

Railway lines in Île-de-France
Railway lines opened in 1907
Railway lines closed in 1935